John Edward Briggs (born March 10, 1944) is an American former professional baseball left fielder who played in Major League Baseball (MLB) for the Philadelphia Phillies (–), Milwaukee Brewers (–), and Minnesota Twins (1975).
 
Briggs was born in Paterson, New Jersey, where he played high school baseball at Eastside High School. He then moved on to Seton Hall University. Briggs batted .297 with 21 home runs, 20 doubles and six triples.

Although as a 20-year-old, Briggs played sparingly in 1964 (with just 76 plate appearances), he would win a platoon outfield spot with Philadelphia in 1965 and never return to the minor leagues. He appeared in over 100 games from 1967 through his final MLB campaign in 1975. He was traded from the Phillies to the Brewers for Pete Koegel and Ray Peters on April 22, 1971. On August 4, 1973, when, while batting leadoff, he went 6-for-6, with two doubles and two runs scored, to spark the Brewers to a 9-4 road victory, over the Cleveland Indians. He was dealt from the Brewers to the Twins for Bobby Darwin on June 14, 1975.

In his 12-season big league career, Briggs posted a .253 batting average, a .355 on-base percentage, with 1,041 hits, 170 doubles, 43 triples, 139 home runs, and 507 run batted in (RBI), in 1,366 games played.

See also
List of Major League Baseball single-game hits leaders

References

External links

Johnny Briggs at SABR (Baseball BioProject)
Johnny Briggs at Baseball Almanac
Johnny Briggs at Baseballbiography.com

1944 births
Living people
African-American baseball players
American expatriate baseball players in Japan
Bakersfield Bears players
Baseball players from Paterson, New Jersey
Eastside High School (Paterson, New Jersey) alumni
Lotte Orions players
Major League Baseball left fielders
Milwaukee Brewers players
Minnesota Twins players
Philadelphia Phillies players
Seton Hall Pirates baseball players
21st-century African-American people
20th-century African-American sportspeople